Bull oak is a common name for a number of species of Australian trees. Some of the species involved are:

 Most commonly members of the Casuarinaceae or she-oaks, including:
 Allocasuarina luehmannii, bull oak or buloke
 Casuarina cristata, belah
 Cardwellia, northern silky oak

Trees
Flora of Australia